Barcelona Metro line 11 is a light metro line with short trains in Barcelona, Catalonia, Spain.

Line 11, coloured light green and currently known as Trinitat Nova – Can Cuiàs, is a recently built line in the Barcelona Metro network, operated by TMB, and part of the ATM fare-integrated transport network in the Barcelona. Together with Barcelona metro line 8, it's the only metro line in Barcelona to be a light metro.

Overview
Line 11 is one of the more recent addition to the main TMB network, having opened in 2003. It serves the hilly and dense northern corner of Barcelona, from La Trinitat Nova, where it links with L4, to Can Cuiàs.

The color assigned to this line by TMB is intended to represent a mixture of the official colours of L4 and L3, which join it at Trinitat Nova, its —at least temporarily— starting point. Additional metro lines projected to be built in following years will probably be quite similar to L11, and their colours have been designed using the same convention.

History

The entire segment between Trinitat Nova and Can Cuiàs opened in 2003.

Future plans call for an extension to Universitat Autònoma de Barcelona and Ripollet.

Rolling stock
The rolling stock on Line 11 is the 500 series. Its composition is unique in the network, as there are just three two-car trains running on this line.

Stations

References

External links
 Line 11 at Trenscat.com

11
Transport in Nou Barris
Transport in Montcada i Reixac
Standard gauge railways in Spain
Railway lines opened in 2003